Hispanic immigrants living in the United States are found to have high levels of mental illness, high levels of exposure to trauma, and low mental health service utilization. Those who met the criteria for asylum, and experience trauma before migrating, are vulnerable to post-traumatic stress disorder (PTSD) symptoms. Higher levels of trauma-related symptoms are associated with increased post-migration living difficulties. Despite the need for mental health services for Hispanic immigrants living in the United States, cultural and structural barriers make accessing treatment challenging.

Trauma exposure among immigrants 
Immigrants fleeing violence, undocumented immigrants, and immigrants seeking asylum report elevated levels of psychological distress and exposure to trauma. The stressful events that contribute to these poor mental health outcomes can occur before, during, and after migration. This, in combination with access to care, resettlement experience, type of trauma, and demographic factors all interact to determine the severity of symptoms. PTSD is less common among immigrants who have not experienced political violence. A review of studies on international immigrants also did not identify an increased risk of depression within the average immigrant population. Trauma among immigrant populations depends on the context and culture of each group. The research cannot be generalized to apply to all immigrant populations.

Pre-migration trauma 
Research on PTSD and trauma among immigrant populations frequently categorizes traumatic events as pre-migration, migration, and post-migration trauma. Each stage involves a different set of risk factors. Pre-migration trauma refers to traumatic events experienced before immigration. In a study of Honduran, Columbian, and Guatemalan immigrants seeking refuge in the United States, 83% cited violence as a main reason for fleeing their country, and 87% reported experiencing traumatic events. This was correlated with higher rates of PTSD, depression, and combined PTSD with depression. Refugees who flee political violence present with similar levels of psychopathology as well.

Migration trauma 
Migration trauma refers to traumatic events experienced during the process of migration. Individuals immigrating from Latin America to the United States by foot or land are the most vulnerable during their migratory journey. A study on migration trauma among women immigrating from Central America, South America, and Mexico identified instances of violence, deprivation, and fear. Some women reported sexual assault, rape, or transactional sex during their migration. Interpersonal trauma such as rape or physical violence is associated with higher levels of PTSD, and combined PTSD with depression.

Post-migration trauma 
Post-migration trauma refers to trauma experienced once the individual arrives in their destination country. In the United States, Hispanic immigrants may face parent-child separation at the border, limited access to services, discrimination, and mistrust. This can increase the risk of developing mental health disorders, and worsen the effects of previous traumas.

Barriers to mental health care 
Individuals immigrating to the United States from Latin America, especially those who qualify for asylum, have an increased need for mental health treatment. Hispanic immigrants, however seek treatment at disproportionately lower rates. Cultural barriers to care (attitudes and social perceptions that impact one’s willingness to use services), structural barriers to care (external systems of limitation), and refugee-specific barriers to care (e.g., immigration status, confidentiality concerns, and trust) account for much of this disparity.

Cultural barriers to care 
Cultural barriers to mental health care among Hispanic immigrants include stigma, and knowledge of Western models of mental health. Research demonstrates a negative relationship between stigma and mental health treatment-seeking among Hispanic immigrants. The effect that Western models of mental health have on treatment-seeking is less clear. While a study revealed that Hispanic immigrants residing in the United States could identify the common signs and symptoms of depression, it is less clear whether this translates to PTSD. Given the prevalence of culturally-bound trauma syndromes in Hispanic populations, further research is needed to determine whether there is difficulty recognizing Western conceptualizations of PTSD, and whether this hinders treatment-seeking.

Structural barriers to care 
Structural barriers to care refers to external systems that limit one’s ability to receive appropriate services. Among a sample of Hispanic immigrants, the most reported structural barriers to care included cost (59%), lack of insurance (35%), and limited English proficiency (31%). Those with an existing mental disorder also experienced more cost barriers than those without an existing mental disorder. Other frequently cited structural barriers to care within Hispanic immigrant populations include immigration status, treatment method, and unfamiliarity with mental health services.

Post-migration living difficulties 
Immigrants arriving with limited resources experience post-migration living difficulties – stressors that impact their ability to support themselves and engage with society. The direct causal association between post-migration living difficulties and psychopathology is unclear.

Impact of trauma on post-migration living difficulties 
There is a strong relationship between PTSD symptoms and post-migration living difficulties. Trauma has been shown to be passed down generations, long after the initial migration. This transgenerational trauma hinders their ability to parent their children. Children grow up embodying the negative emotional traits of their caretakers. A study on post-migration living difficulties among Latina immigrants found that emotional distress and difficulties building trust impacted one’s ability to build strong social connections post migration. This led to recommendations that asylum policies focus on reducing post-migration problems.

References

Mental health in the United States
Post-traumatic stress disorder
Refugees